Valarie Carolyn Allman (born February 23, 1995) is an American track and field athlete specializing in the discus throw. She won the gold medal at the 2020 Summer Olympics. At the 2022 World Athletics Championships, she won a bronze medal, which made her the first American woman to win a world championship medal in the discus throw.

Career
Allman was a seven-time All-American at Stanford University. She went on to represent her country at the 2017 Summer Universiade, where she won a silver medal, and the 2017 World Championships, where she did not qualify for the final. She was the 2018 National Champion. Also, she earned bronze at the 2018 Athletics World Cup and silver at the 2018 NACAC Championships. She won the gold medal at the 2020 Summer Olympics. At the 2022 World Athletics Championships, she won a bronze medal, which made her the first American woman to win a world championship medal in the discus throw.

This was the 15th farthest throw in history and the farthest in almost 30 years. 

She now resides in Austin, Texas, and trains under Coach Zebulon Sion at the University of Texas, where she is a volunteer assistant. She was sponsored by Oiselle through 2020, as well as the New York Athletic Club. She is currently sponsored by Asics.

Personal life
Allman was born at Christiana Hospital in Newark, Delaware. Allman graduated from Silver Creek High School, in Longmont, Colorado, in 2013. She graduated in 2017 from Stanford University with a B.S. in product design.

International competitions

References

External links
 
 
 
 
 
 

1995 births
Living people
People from Newark, Delaware
Sportspeople from the Delaware Valley
Track and field athletes from Delaware
American female discus throwers
World Athletics Championships athletes for the United States
Stanford Cardinal women's track and field athletes
Universiade medalists in athletics (track and field)
Universiade silver medalists for the United States
USA Outdoor Track and Field Championships winners
Competitors at the 2015 Summer Universiade
Medalists at the 2017 Summer Universiade
Athletes (track and field) at the 2020 Summer Olympics
Medalists at the 2020 Summer Olympics
Olympic gold medalists for the United States in track and field
Diamond League winners
20th-century American women
21st-century American women